Leiba may refer to:

Leiba Township in Gansu in the People's Republic of China

People with the surname
Barry Leiba (born 1957), American computer scientist
Raw Leiba, American actor